Miloš Milutinović (5 February 1933 – 28 January 2003) was a Serbian professional footballer and manager from Yugoslavia.

Milutinović is regarded as one of the most talented players in his country's history and one of the most talented wingers/forwards of all time, being nicknamed Plava čigra (The Blond Buzzer) for his skills.

Club career
During his club career, Milutinović played for FK Bor, FK Partizan, OFK Beograd, FC Bayern Munich, RCF Paris, and Stade Français Paris. In the 1955–56 season, he scored two goals in the first ever European Champion Clubs' Cup match, a 3–3 draw between FK Partizan and Sporting Clube de Portugal, then scored four goals in the return leg which Partizan won 5–2 in Belgrade. In the quarter-finals second leg, he scored two goals in a 3–0 win over eventual champions Real Madrid, but that was not enough to overcome Real Madrid's 4–0 win in the first leg.

In total, he played 213 matches and scored 231 goals for FK Partizan, winning two national cups (1954 and 1957). He then moved to OFK Beograd and later to Bayern Munich. In 1959, he underwent surgery for his ongoing lung problems. He stayed one year in Germany before playing in France.

International career
For the Yugoslavia national football team, Milutinović was named the player of the tournament as Yugoslavia won the European youth title in 1951, finishing top scorer with four goals. He made his full international debut on 21 May 1953 against Wales, in a 5–2 victory.

Milutinović earned 33 caps in total and represented the country in the 1954 and 1958 World Cups.

International goals

Managerial career
After retirement from playing, Milutinović became a manager, and managed OFK Beograd, FK Dubočica (Leskovac), FK Proleter (Zrenjanin), Atlas, Beşiktaş J.K., Altay, FK Velež Mostar (won national cup in 1981 and Balkans Cup in 1981), FK Partizan (won national championship in 1983), and the Yugoslavia national team.

Personal life

Miloš was the brother of famous football manager Bora Milutinović, and  brother of 1958 World Cup teammate Milorad Milutinović. In a 2006 interview, his former team-mate Dragoslav Šekularac said that "Miloš Milutinović as a player was a 9/10 and as a man was a 29/10."

He died on 23 January 2003 in Belgrade, at the age of 69. His son Uroš (also a footballer) died in 2015.

Honours

Player
Partizan 
Yugoslav Cup: 1954, 1956–57

Manager
Velež Mostar 
Yugoslav Cup: 1980–81
Balkans Cup: 1980–81

Partizan
Yugoslav First League: 1982–83

References

External links
 Profile at reprezentacija.rs

1933 births
2003 deaths
People from Bajina Bašta
Serbian footballers
Serbian football managers
Yugoslav football managers
Yugoslav expatriate football managers
1954 FIFA World Cup players
1958 FIFA World Cup players
Yugoslav footballers
Yugoslavia international footballers
FK Bor players
FK Partizan players
OFK Beograd players
FC Bayern Munich footballers
Racing Club de France Football players
Stade Français (association football) players
Yugoslav First League players
Ligue 1 players
Serbian expatriate footballers
Yugoslav expatriate footballers
Expatriate footballers in Germany
Expatriate footballers in France
Expatriate football managers in Mexico
Expatriate football managers in Turkey
Yugoslav expatriate sportspeople in Germany
Yugoslav expatriate sportspeople in France
Yugoslav expatriate sportspeople in Mexico
Yugoslav expatriate sportspeople in Turkey
Association football wingers
Association football forwards
Yugoslav First League managers
Süper Lig managers
OFK Beograd managers
Atlas F.C. managers
Beşiktaş J.K. managers
FK Velež Mostar managers
FK Partizan managers
Yugoslavia national football team managers
Altay S.K. managers
UEFA Champions League top scorers